The Swarthmore Phoenix is an independent campus newspaper at Swarthmore College. It was founded in 1881 or 1882.

History

The Phoenix has deep roots in Swarthmore lore. When the College's iconic Parrish Hall was gutted by fire in 1881, it was immediately rebuilt, rising, some noted, from the ashes like the bird found in Egyptian and Greek mythology. Thereafter, The Phoenix became the name of the campus newspaper.

With an early staff that often numbered fewer than 10, The Phoenix was first published monthly, then moved to a bi-weekly schedule in 1894; it is now published weekly with a paid staff of more than 40 editors, reporters, and columnists. Its first female editor-in-chief, Martha Shirk, was elected in 1972. The Phoenix first appeared online in September 1995.

Notable coverage
In 2019, documents leaked by The Phoenix helped lead to the disbanding of Greek life at Swarthmore.

Alumni
William C. Sproul, governor of Pennsylvania
Drew Pearson, journalist
Heywood Hale Broun, actor and broadcaster

References

Bibliography

External links

1880s establishments in Pennsylvania
Student newspapers published in Pennsylvania